Lintong railway station is a railway station of Longhai railway located in Lintong District, Xi'an, Shaanxi, China.

The station is currently out of passenger services.

History 
The station was opened in 1934.

References 

Railway stations in Shaanxi
Stations on the Longhai Railway
Railway stations in China opened in 1934